Eemeli Heikkinen (born August 29, 1994) is a Finnish professional ice hockey player. He is currently playing for HIFK of the Finnish Liiga.

Heikkinen made his Liiga debut playing with HIFK during the 2014-15 Liiga season.

References

External links

1994 births
Living people
Kiekko-Vantaa players
HIFK (ice hockey) players
Finnish ice hockey defencemen
Ice hockey people from Helsinki